Kathy Griffin: My Life on the D-List is an American reality television series on Bravo. The pilot episode of the show was broadcast on August 3, 2005.The series focuses on Griffin's scheming for publicity with staffers Jessica, Tiffany, and Tom. Her relationships with her parents and her now ex-husband have also been heavily featured. In addition, her relationships and dating life are also featured.

Griffin had titled her first Bravo comedy special The D-List (2004), to imply that her pull as a bottom-feeder celebrity was so low, she didn't even make the "C-list." The special was so popular that the network later approached Griffin to film a reality series based on her celebrity-bashing comedy.

Series overview

Episodes

Season 1 (2005)

Season 2 (2006)

Season 3 (2007)

Season 4 (2008)

Season 5 (2009)

Season 6 (2010)

References

Kathy Griffin
Kathy Griffin: My Life on the D-List episodes
Kathy Griffin: My Life on the D-List episodes